Chinaman: The Legend of Pradeep Mathew is a 2010 novel by Shehan Karunatilaka. Using cricket as a device to write about Sri Lankan society, the book tells the story of an alcoholic journalist's quest to track down a missing cricketer of the 1980s. The novel was critically hailed on publication, winning awards and much positive review coverage.

On 21 May 2012, Chinaman was announced as the regional winner for Asia of the Commonwealth Book Prize and went on to win the overall Commonwealth Book Prize announced on 8 June. It also won the 2012 DSC Prize for South Asian Literature, and the 2008 Gratiaen Prize. Published to great acclaim in India and the UK, the novel was among the Waterstones 11 selected by British bookseller Waterstones as one of the top debuts of 2011 and was also shortlisted for the Shakti Bhatt First Book Prize.

In April 2019, Chinaman was voted among the best cricket books ever by Wisden. In 2022, the novel was included on the "Big Jubilee Read" list of 70 books by Commonwealth authors, selected to celebrate the Platinum Jubilee of Elizabeth II.

Plot and style
The novel documents, in first-person narrative, the attempts of its alcoholic writer to reclaim the legacy of one bowler, Pradeep Mathew – never mind that this same narrator might be attempting to recover his own lost greatness by discovering another's. What he finds is a world of thugs, booze, gambling, questionable honour, national interests that might be opposed to the truth, and a web of lies, half-truths, observed falsehoods, cheating and gamesmanship. In the end, our narrator cannot finish his book, because he cannot stay away from drinking, or his own failures. The task falls to others to finish this attempt to find the greatest bowler ever, and the man who might have made the greatness of Sri Lanka's cricket championships.

Karunatilaka has acknowledged a debt to Kurt Vonnegut in searching to find a narrative voice that is "wise, silly, funny and occasionally profound" and in the use of such innovations as "the short explanatory chapter and the non-sequitur illustration".

Publication
After the manuscript of Chinaman won the 2008 Gratiaen Prize, Shehan Karunatilaka contacted local and international publishers to assist him in editing the novel but was unable to find anyone to perform the large structural edit that he felt the book needed. He chose to publish the book himself instead. Karunatilaka's wife, Eranga Tennekoon, created the book's cover, while his brother, Lalith Karunathilake, created the illustrations. Karunatilaka's friend Deshan Tennekoon completed the typesetting and font design, while screenwriter Ruwanthie de Chickera completed the structural edit for Chinaman. Michael Meyler completed line edits and Adam Smyth proofed the novel. The book was self-published in 2010, printed by Silverline Graphics and distributed through Perera Hussein Publishing House.

In 2011, Chiki Sarkar of Random House India bought Chinaman and helped Karunatilaka edit it, removing nearly 100 pages. The cover art and font and were redone and the novel was published by Random House India and published internationally by Jonathan Cape, an imprint of Random House, in 2011.

In 2015, a Sinhala-language translation by Dileepa Abeysekera was published by Diogenes with the title Chinaman: Pradeep Mathewge Cricket Pravadaya.

Reception
A review for The Guardian by Nicholas Lezard referenced the historical use in cricket of the term "chinaman" to describe "a particular delivery, a slower ball designed to fool the batsman into thinking it will bounce in the opposite direction to the one it does", and praised the book, writing of its style: "This long, languorous and winding novel has registers of tragedy, farce, laugh-out-loud humour and great grace." Tishani Doshi commented on the ways Karunatilaka "mixes humour and violence with the same deftness with which his protagonist mixes drinks."

Salil Tripathi of The Independent considered the book to be a contender for the "Great Sri Lankan Novel", as did Shashi Tharoor, who wrote: "Shehan Karunatilaka's extraordinary first novel is manifestly a work of genius—one that manages to be about Sri Lanka without being overtly about it, and seems to be about cricket but goes well beyond it."

Ludovic Hunter-Tilney of the Financial Times gave the novel a mixed review, noting: "The chronological structure darts around confusingly and there's an awkwardly tacked-on subplot about an English expat friend accused of pederasty"; however, he concluded that the novel's "free-wheeling, zany tempo is part of its charm too".

In January 2012, Chinaman won the DSC Prize for South Asian Literature, and in May 2012 was announced as the regional winner for Asia of the Commonwealth Book Prize, going on to be selected as the overall winner in June 2012, when chair of judges Margaret Busby said: "This fabulously enjoyable read will keep you entertained and rooting for the protagonist until the very end, while delivering startling truths about cricket and about Sri Lanka."

The novel was praised by The Cricket Monthly as "a cavorting read", and in April 2019, was voted among the best cricket books ever by Wisden.

Chinaman was included on the "Big Jubilee Read" list of 70 books selected by a panel of experts, and announced by the BBC and The Reading Agency in April 2022, to celebrate the Platinum Jubilee of Elizabeth II in June 2022.

Awards and honours
2008: Gratiaen Prize, winner
2012: DSC Prize for South Asian Literature, overall winner
2012: Commonwealth Book Prize, overall winner
2022: Big Jubilee Read selection

References

2010 novels
2010 debut novels
First-person narrative novels
Novels about cricket
Novels set in Sri Lanka
Random House books
Self-published books
Sri Lankan English-language novels